The Iredell P. Vaughn House, also known as the Vaughn-Morrow House, is a historic house in Eutaw, Alabama.  The one-story wood-frame house was built c. 1841.  It generally conforms to the Creole cottage-type house plan, with neoclassical stylistic elements.  A one-story porch spans the full width of the east and south facades.  It was added to the National Register of Historic Places as part of the Antebellum Homes in Eutaw Thematic Resource on April 2, 1982.  It currently serves as the headquarters of the Greene County Historical Society.

References

Houses completed in 1841
National Register of Historic Places in Greene County, Alabama
Houses on the National Register of Historic Places in Alabama
Houses in Greene County, Alabama
Creole cottage architecture in Alabama